Germán Valera Karabinaite (born 16 March 2002) is a Spanish footballer who plays as a right winger for FC Andorra, on loan from Atlético Madrid.

Club career
Born in Murcia to a Lithuanian mother, Valera joined Atlético Madrid's youth setup in 2018, from Villarreal CF. Promoted to the reserves for the 2019–20 season, he made his senior debut on 24 August 2019, coming on as second-half substitute in a 2–1 Segunda División B away win against Marino de Luanco.

Valera scored his first senior goal on 13 October 2019, scoring his team's third in a 3–0 home defeat of Coruxo FC. He made his first team – and La Liga – debut the following 4 January, replacing João Félix late into a 2–1 home success over Levante UD.

On 1 February 2021, Valera renewed his contract until 2026 and moved to Segunda División side CD Tenerife on loan for the remainder of the season. On 11 August, he moved to fellow second division side Real Sociedad B on a one-year loan deal.

On 25 August 2022, Valera joined FC Andorra also in the second level, on a one-year loan deal.

International career
Eligible to play for Spain or Lithuania, Valera is a youth international footballer for the former.

References

External links

2002 births
Living people
Footballers from Murcia
Spanish footballers
Spanish people of Lithuanian descent
Association football wingers
La Liga players
Segunda División players
Segunda División B players
Atlético Madrid B players
Atlético Madrid footballers
CD Tenerife players
Real Sociedad B footballers
Real Sociedad footballers
FC Andorra players
Spain youth international footballers